Automate is the second studio album by the electronic band Forma Tadre. It was released in 1998 on Metropolis Records. This album is quite different from the group's previous record, Navigator, as it has a more ambient feel.

Track listing
 "La Cité" – 3:24
 "Passage North" – 1:13
 "Sinus Park" – 6:42
 "Lo Rez Skylin" – 4:09
 "Le Musée des Appareils" – 10:09
 "Node Rituals" – 4:36
 "Automate" – 4:31
 "Dagon" – 5:47
 "Passage Center" – 1:08
 "L'Exodus" – 5:46

See also
 Forma Tadre

External links
 Allmusic – [  link]
 Last.fm – link

1998 albums
Forma Tadre albums
Metropolis Records albums